Gymnocalycium oenanthemum is a species of flowering plant in the family Cactaceae, endemic to Argentina. In summer it bears a wine-red or pink daisy-like flower. 

In cultivation in the UK and other temperate regions it cannot survive freezing, so at least in the winter months it must be kept indoors in a bright, cool environment with minimal watering. It has gained the Royal Horticultural Society’s Award of Garden Merit.

References

oenanthemum
Cacti of South America
Endemic flora of Argentina
Endangered flora of South America
Plants described in 1934